Dinarvand-e Olya (also Romanized as Dīnārvand-e ‘Olyā) is a village in Koregah-e Sharqi Rural District, in the Central District of Khorramabad County, Lorestan Province, Iran. At the 2006 census, its population was 940, in 184 families.

References 

Towns and villages in Khorramabad County